Sun Source Football Club, currently known as Lansbury due to sponsorship reasons, is a Hong Kong football club which currently competes in the Hong Kong Third Division.

History
The club earned the right to be promoted to the Hong Kong Premier League after winning the 2014–15 Hong Kong First Division League with two games to spare. However, the club eventually declined promotion, citing financial difficulties.

The following season, Sun Source was relegated to the Second Division after finishing 13th in the First Division. From 2016 to 2018, the club was branded as HKU CXSC Sun Source.

In the 2018–19 season, Sun Source was rebranded as Qiyi Hanstti. However, the club was relegated again to the Third Division after finishing 13th in the Second Division.

In the 2019–20 season, Sun Source was rebranded again as Lansbury, and was coached by former Kawasaki Frontale and Eastern player Yusuke Igawa.

Honours

League
 Hong Kong First Division
Champions (1): 2014–15
 Hong Kong Third Division
Champions (1): 2013–14
 Hong Kong Third A Division League
Champions (1): 2005–06

Cup
 Hong Kong FA Cup Preliminary Round
Champions (1): 2013–14

References

External links
Sun Source at HKFA

Football clubs in Hong Kong
Hong Kong Third Division League